The Bosnian Wikipedia is the Bosnian language version of Wikipedia, hosted by the Wikimedia Foundation. It was created on December 12, 2002, and its first article was Matematika.

Community 
On February 17, 2007, members of the Bosnian wiki community held the first in-person meet-up event in Sarajevo. Another meeting was held in the same year, followed by meetings in 2008 and 2011.

Media attention and controversies 
Since 2021 onwards, administrators on the Bosnian Wikipedia have been a target of accusations by several anonymous tabloid sources of promoting "Croatian nationalist political agenda", like the one which has long been present on the Croatian Wikipedia project. According to these reports, academics, professors and students from Sarajevo with profession in the field of history and politics allegedly faced selective reverting without explanations, negation of the Bosnian national identity in favor of ethnic labels (Bosniak, Croat, Serb) where inappropriate (i.e. Bosnian history predominantly portrayed as Croatian or Serbian), as well as discrediting eminent historians as reliable sources in articles (favoring unreliable web portals instead). In November 2022, an anonymously written article from Preporod, the official gazette of the Islamic Community in Bosnia and Herzegovina, repeated the concerns and called for founding of the local "Wikimedia Bosnia and Herzegovina" chapter which would financially and systemically influence the editing practices of Bosnian Wikipedia. None of the authors of the accusatory news articles have interviewed or reached to the concerned Bosnian Wikipedia administrators, with latter refuting these accusations based on firm policies against original research and editorial synthesis.

Notes 
 The Bosnian language officially uses two scripts, Latin and Cyrillic; however, the Bosnian-language Wikipedia does not feature a script converter like the Serbian and Serbo-Croatian language editions do.
 Bosnian is one of four standardized varieties of the Serbo-Croatian pluricentric language, making the practice of copying content between the four Wikipedias (Serbo-Croatian, Serbian, Croatian, Bosnian) with none or minimal textual changes easy and common.

References

External links 

 Bosnian Wikipedia
 Bosnian Wikipedia mobile

Internet properties established in 2002
Wikipedias by language
Bosnian-language mass media
European encyclopedias